Santa Lucía District is one of ten districts of the province Lampa in Peru.

Geography 
Some of the highest mountains of the district are listed below:

Ethnic groups 
The people in the district are mainly indigenous citizens of Quechua descent. Quechua is the language which the majority of the population (56.93%) learnt to speak in childhood, 42.36% of the residents started speaking using the Spanish language (2007 Peru Census).

See also 
 Lagunillas Lake
 Suyt'uqucha

References